Saurians: Unnatural Selection was an American comic book mini-series published by CrossGen Entertainment from February to March, 2002. It was set in the Sigilverse, CrossGen's shared universe, and was a spin-off of the company's ongoing title, Sigil, although the events of the miniseries take place several years earlier.

Storyline details 
As the series opens, the human-inhabited Planetary Union and the Saurian Hegemony have been at war for four hundred years. Saurian warrior Terchac has been on the forefront of this war for two hundred years.  Lost in an off-world jungle and the last of his unit, Terchac is hunted down by a unit of humans. Catching them by surprise Terchac takes out some of the humans. Upon confronting each other the humans offer a temporary alliance with Terchac in order to escape the jungle.  Terchac reluctantly goes along with the plan only to find to his dismay that he has been tricked by his enemy.

2002 comics debuts
Comic book limited series
CrossGen titles
Comics by Mark Waid